is a Japanese business leader and politician. He served in the House of Representatives of Japan and was the minister of justice from 1998 to 1999.

Career
Nakamura was a business leader. He served in the lower house of the Japanese Diet. He also held the positions of state minister for the environment agency and parliamentary vice-minister for finance.

He was appointed justice minister in the cabinet led by Prime Minister Keizo Obuchi on 30 July 1998. Nakamura replaced Kokichi Shimoinaba as justice minister. Nakamura's term ended on 8 March 1999 when he resigned from office over the controversy sparked when Arnold Schwarzenegger was allowed to enter Japan without a passport in October 1998. Takao Jinnouchi became justice minister on 8 March 1999, replacing Nakamura in the post.

Personal life
Nakamura was among the richest members of the lower house and was ranked fourth with assets worth about 1.5 billion yen in 2000.

References

External links

20th-century Japanese politicians
1934 births
Japanese defense ministers
Liberal Democratic Party (Japan) politicians
Living people
Members of the House of Representatives (Japan)
Ministers of Justice of Japan